Helen Catherine Anne Keogh (born 3 June 1951) is an Irish businesswoman, former Fine Gael politician who was Chief Executive of World Vision Ireland from 2003 until May 2018. She previously served as a Senator from 1989 to 1992 and 1997 to 2002 and a Teachta Dála (TD) for the Dún Laoghaire constituency from 1992 to 1997.

A former teacher, guidance counsellor and businesswoman, Keogh was an unsuccessful Progressive Democrats candidate at the 1987 general election, the first election after the party was founded. She did not contest the 1989 general election but was nominated as a member of the 19th Seanad by Taoiseach Charles Haughey.

She was elected to Dáil Éireann as a Progressive Democrats TD for the Dún Laoghaire constituency at the 1992 general election. She lost her seat at the 1997 general election to Monica Barnes of Fine Gael. She was then nominated by Taoiseach Bertie Ahern to the 21st Seanad.

She joined Fine Gael in 2000 and unsuccessfully stood for election in both the 2002 general election and the 2002 Seanad election.

She was elected a local councillor for Dún Laoghaire–Rathdown County Council in 1991 and re-elected in 1999. She ran unsuccessfully for the Seanad on the NUI Panel in 2011.

She was appointed Chairperson of the Board of Dóchas - the Irish Association of Non-Governmental Development Organisations in 2006 and was elected for a second term of office in 2008.

References

1951 births
Living people
Progressive Democrats TDs
Fine Gael politicians
Members of the 19th Seanad
Members of the 21st Seanad
20th-century women members of Seanad Éireann
21st-century women members of Seanad Éireann
Members of the 27th Dáil
20th-century women Teachtaí Dála
Local councillors in Dún Laoghaire–Rathdown
People from Dún Laoghaire
Nominated members of Seanad Éireann
Progressive Democrats senators